Charles Gabriel may refer to:

 Charles A. Gabriel (1928–2003), Chief of Staff of the United States Air Force
 Charles H. Gabriel (1856–1932), writer of gospel songs and composer of gospel tunes
 Charles John Gabriel (1879–1963), Australian conchologist
 Charles Louis Gabriel (1857–1927), Australian photographer and medical practitioner